The Canadian Catholic Church, or Catholic Church in Canada, is part of the worldwide Catholic Church, and has a decentralised structure, meaning each diocesan bishop is autonomous but under the spiritual leadership of the Pope and the Canadian Conference of Catholic Bishops. As of 2021, it has the largest number of adherents to a Christian denomination and a religion in Canada, with 29.4% of Canadians (10.8 million) being adherents according to the census in 2021. There are 73 dioceses and about 7,000 priests in Canada. On a normal Sunday, between 15 and 25 percent of Canada's Catholics attend Mass (15 per cent weekly attenders and another nine per cent monthly).

History

First Catholics in Canada
Catholicism arrived in the territory later known as Canada in 1000, with the landing at L'Anse aux Meadows by Leif Ericson (whose mother had converted and brought Catholicism to what became the Diocese of Garðar, Greenland), his sister and at least two brothers, according to the Vinland Sagas. Beginning in 1013, Norway (presumably also intended to include all her colonies, like Orkney, as later under Denmark-Norway), came into personal union with the Kingdom of England, in the rule of Sweyn Forkbeard.

In 1497, when John Cabot landed on the same island of Newfoundland on the Avalon Peninsula, he raised the Venetian and Papal banners and claimed the land for his sponsor King Henry VII of England, while recognizing the religious authority of the Catholic Church. A letter of John Day states that Cabot landed on 24 June 1497 and "he landed at only one spot of the mainland, near the place where land was first sighted, and they disembarked there with a crucifix and raised banners with the arms of the Holy Father and those of the King of England".
In 1608, Samuel de Champlain founded the first Catholic colony in Quebec City.

Missionary work among Indigenous peoples began in the early 1610s as a stipulated condition to the colonization projects of the King of France. Historian Robert Choquette credits secular priest Jessé Fleché as the first to perform dozens of baptisms on Indigenous peoples, which impacted the religious landscape of Mi'kma'ki. Jessé Fleché's ministry was criticized by Jesuits who believed Fleché erred in baptizing neophytes without teaching them the Catholic faith beforehand. In 1611, the Society of Jesus started its missionary work in Acadia. Unlike their predecessor, the Jesuits began their work on Mi'kma'ki by learning the local language and living alongside the Mi'kmaq in order to instruct and convert them to Catholicism.

In 1620, George Calvert, 1st Baron Baltimore purchased a tract of land in Newfoundland from Sir William Vaughan and established a colony, calling it Avalon, after the legendary spot where Christianity was introduced to Britain. In 1627 Calvert brought two Catholic priests to Avalon. This was the first continuous Catholic ministry in British North America. Despite the severe religious conflicts of the period, Calvert secured the right of Catholics to practice their religion unimpeded in Newfoundland, and embraced the novel principle of religious tolerance, which he wrote into the Charter of Avalon and the later Charter of Maryland. The Colony of Avalon was thus the first North American jurisdiction to practice religious tolerance.

British Rule in Canada
In the wake of the Canada Conquest in 1759, New France became a British colony.  Nevertheless, the Catholic Church continued to grow in Canada due to the flexibility imposed on the British regime in Canada by the Treaty of Paris (1763) on sovereigns of the United Kingdom who allowed the favour of the protection of Catholicism and French-speaking people in Canada. This historical perspective still influences Canadian society today.

Anti-Catholicism 

Fears of the Catholic Church were quite strong in the 19th century, especially among Presbyterian and other Protestant Irish immigrants across Canada. In 1853, the Gavazzi Riots left 10 dead in Quebec in the wake of Catholic Irish protest against anti-Catholic speeches by ex-monk Alessandro Gavazzi.

The major flashpoint was public support for Catholic French language schools. Although the Confederation Agreement of 1867 guaranteed the status of Catholic schools where they had been legalized, disputes erupted in numerous provinces, especially in the Manitoba Schools Question in the 1890s and Ontario in the 1910s. In Ontario, Regulation 17 was a regulation by the Ontario Ministry of Education, that restricted the use of French as a language of instruction to the first two years of schooling. French Canada reacted vehemently and resisted the implementation of the Regulation. This conflict, which was first rooted in linguistic and cultural questions, transformed into a religious divide. In 1915, Ontario clergy was divided between French Canadian and Irish allegiances, with the Irish supporting the position of the provincial government. Pope Benedict XV asked his Canadian representative to study the divide in order to reestablish unity among the Catholic church in the province of Ontario. Regulation 17 is among the reasons why French Canada distanced itself from the war effort, as its young men refused to enlist.

Protestant elements succeeded in blocking the growth of French-language Catholic public schools. The Irish Catholics generally supported the English language position advocated by the Protestants. Despite this, French language education in Ontario continues today in Catholic and public schools.

French versus Irish 

The central theme of Catholic history from the 1840s through the 1920s was the contest for control of the church between the French Canadians, based in Quebec, and the English-speaking Irish Canadians (along with smaller numbers of Catholic Scottish Canadians, English, and others) based in Ontario. The French Catholics saw Catholics in general as God's chosen people (versus Protestants) and the French as more truly Catholic than any other ethnic group.  The fact that the Irish Catholics formed coalition with the anti-French Protestants further infuriated the French.

The Irish Catholics collaborated with Protestants inside Canada, on the school issue: they opposed French language Catholic schools. The Irish had a significant advantage since they were favoured by the Vatican. Irish Catholicism was "ultramontane", which meant its adherents professed total obedience to the Pope. By contrast, the French bishops in Canada kept their distance from the Vatican. In the form of Regulation 17 this became the central issue that finally alienated the French in Quebec from the Canadian Anglophone establishment during the First World War. Ontario's Catholics were led by the Irish Bishop Fallon, who united with the Protestants in opposing French schools. Regulation 17 was repealed in 1927. The French-speakers remain more liberal than the English-speakers to this day, and in addition are also leaving the faith much more quickly.

One by one, the Irish took control of the church in each province except for Quebec. Tensions were especially high in Manitoba at the end of the 19th century.  In Alberta in the 1920s, a new Irish bishop undermined French language Catholic schooling, and removed the Francophile order of teaching sisters.

Newfoundland 
In the Dominion of Newfoundland (which was an independent dominion before joining Canada in 1949), politics was polarized around religious lines, with the Protestants confronting the Irish Catholics.

The future Archdiocese of St. John's was established on 30 May 1784 as Catholics in Newfoundland gradually gained religious liberty, made explicit by a public declaration by Governor John Campbell. After a request from Irish merchants in St. John's to Bishop William Egan, Bishop of Waterford and Lismore, James Louis O'Donel was appointed Prefect Apostolic of Newfoundland. This was the first Roman Catholic ecclesiastical jurisdiction established in English-speaking North America.

In 1861, the Protestant governor dismissed the Catholic Liberals from office and the ensuing election was marked by riot and disorder with both the Anglican bishop Edward Feild and Catholic bishop John Thomas Mullock taking partisan stances. The Protestants narrowly elected Hugh Hoyles as the Conservative Prime Minister. Hoyles suddenly reversed his long record of militant Protestant activism and worked to defuse tensions. He shared patronage and power with the Catholics; all jobs and patronage were split between the various religious bodies on a per capita basis. This 'denominational compromise' was further extended to education when all religious schools were put on the basis which the Catholics had enjoyed since the 1840s.

A series of sexual abuse incidents at Mount Cashel Orphanage, a home for boys run by the Congregation of Christian Brothers, and a police coverup were disclosed in 1989, resulting in the closure of the facility in 1990 after the last resident was moved to an alternate facility. The property was seized and the site razed and sold for real-estate development in the mid-1990s as part of a court settlement ordering financial compensation to the victims.

Newfoundland's denominational schools were funded by the province until the late 1990s. In the fall of 1998, Newfoundland officially adopted a non-denominational school system, following two referendums and judgements by the Supreme Court of Newfoundland and its Court of Appeal that constitutionally recognized the end of provincially-funded all religious denominational schools.

In July 2021, the Roman Catholic Archdiocese of St. John's, Newfoundland announced plans to sell off assets in order to compensate victims of the Mount Cashel sex abuse scandal.

Recent events

Papal visits
In 1984, John Paul II became the first pope to visit Canada. He would visit the country for a total of three times, his final visit being for World Youth Day 2002 in Toronto. Pope Francis visited in July 2022 to apologize in the wake of the Indian school scandal.

Decline
Between 2001 and 2013, the population of Canadians identifying as Catholic remained relatively stagnant, with roughly 12.8 million Canadians self-reporting as Catholic. However, Catholics remained the largest single Christian group in Canada. Church attendance across the Canadian Catholic Church is declining as society becomes more irreligious, resulting in closures of increasing numbers of churches in all provinces and territories in the country.

Indian schools scandal 
The Catholic church ran three-quarters of the 130 Indian schools in Canada, in which more than 150,000 Indigenous children were forced to attend Christian schools with the aim of assimilating them into Canadian society. Disease and hunger was common, and physical and sexual abuse took place, often at the hands of priests and Catholic laypeople. 
The church agreed to pay C$29m in compensation to survivors, but has distributed only C$3.9m, citing poor fundraising efforts. During roughly that same period, however, the church raised C$300m for the construction of new church buildings, including cathedrals, and had more than C$4bn in assets.

Prime minister Justin Trudeau expressed frustration that Pope Francis declined to offer an apology for the Catholic church's role in residential schools."As a Catholic, I am deeply disappointed by the position that the Catholic church has taken now and over the past many years. We expect the church to step up and take responsibility for its role in this and be there to help with the grieving and healing, including with records".Ground penetrating radar has since discovered more than 1,300 unmarked mass graves at former Indian schools. Four out of five were run by the Catholic Church. The resurfacing of the residential schools and gravesites has led some Canadians to leave the church.

Bishop Donald Bolen, of Regina, said in 2022 that Catholic involvement in the residential school system had caused deep wounds and trauma. "Relations between First Nation Peoples and the Catholic Church in Canada carry the burden of a complicated history that people are still grappling with. Colonisation and the government-funded Residential Schools System left First Nations Peoples [the earliest known inhabitants] with a legacy of marginalisation, where their languages, cultures, traditions and spirituality were suppressed. Catholic involvement in this system, and the waves of suffering experienced by so many Indigenous Peoples, including physical, cultural, spiritual and sexual abuses, have left deep wounds and trauma. There is much that the Catholic Church, the Canadian government, and society are accountable for." In 2022, during a visit to Canada, Pope Francis apologised for the church's role in the scandal.

2021 church burnings

Following the increased public awareness of the graves and residential schools, four Catholic churches on First Nations reserves in western Canada were destroyed by fires that investigators regarded as suspicious. Other churches were damaged by fire and vandalism over June and July 2021, with the burnings drawing condemnation from both the Catholic Church and Canadian indigenous figures.

Population
The Catholic population in Canada in 2001 and 2011.

The Catholic population underwent its first recorded drop between 2001 and 2011. Notable trends include the de-Catholicization of Quebec, a drop in the Catholic population in small provinces with stagnant populations, and a rise in Catholics in the large English-speaking provinces of Ontario, British Columbia, and Alberta. Immigration has not helped prevent the decline in the Catholic population; the only major source of Catholic immigrants to Canada is the Philippines. There are also adherents of Eastern Catholic Churches who had already migrated to Canada, most notably the Ukrainians.

Organization 

The Catholic Community in Canada is decentralised, meaning each diocesan bishop is autonomous and is related but not accountable to the Canadian Conference of Catholic Bishops (CCCB). According to the Canadian Conference of Catholic Bishops, Canada is divided in four Episcopal assemblies: the Atlantic Episcopal Assembly, the Assemblée des évêques catholiques du Québec, the Assembly of Catholic Bishops of Ontario and the Assembly of Western Catholic Bishops. The Pope is represented in Canada by the Apostolic Nunciature to Canada (Ottawa).

Within Canada, the Latin hierarchy consists of:
Archdiocese
Diocese

Edmonton
Calgary
Saint Paul
Gatineau
Amos
Mont-Laurier
Rouyn-Noranda
Grouard-McLennan
Mackenzie-Fort Smith
Whitehorse
Halifax-Yarmouth
Antigonish
Charlottetown
Keewatin-Le-Pas
Churchill-Baie d'Hudson
Kingston
Peterborough
Sault Sainte Marie
Moncton
Bathurst 
Edmundston
Saint John
Montréal
Joliette
Saint-Jean-Longueuil
Saint-Jérôme
Valleyfield
Ottawa-Cornwall
Hearst–Moosonee
Pembroke
Timmins
Québec
Chicoutimi
Sainte-Anne-de-la-Pocatière
Trois-Rivières
Regina
Prince-Albert
Saskatoon
Rimouski
Baie-Comeau
Gaspé
Saint-Boniface
St. John's
Grand Falls
Corner Brook and Labrador
Sherbrooke
Nicolet
Saint-Hyacinthe
Toronto
Hamilton
London
Saint Catharines
Thunder Bay
Vancouver
Kamloops
Nelson
Prince George
Victoria
Winnipeg (not Metropolitan)

There is a Military Ordinariate of Canada for Canadian military personnel.

The Anglican use of the Latin Church is served from the United States, based in Houston, Texas, by the Personal Ordinariate of the Chair of Saint Peter.

One former Canadian bishopric, the francophone Diocese of Gravelbourg in Saskatchewan, has since its suppression in 1998 become a titular episcopal see, which may be bestowed on any Latin bishop without proper diocese, working in the Roman Curia or anywhere in the world.

Eastern dioceses 
There is a Ukrainian Greek Catholic (Byzantine Rite) province, headed by the Metropolitan Archeparchy of Winnipeg, which has four suffragan eparchies (dioceses):
 Ukrainian Catholic Eparchy of Edmonton
 Ukrainian Catholic Eparchy of New Westminster
 Ukrainian Catholic Eparchy of Saskatoon
 Ukrainian Catholic Eparchy of Toronto and Eastern Canada in Toronto.
Coptic Catholic Churches in Canada 
1) Notre dame D'Egypt in Laval- Quebec 
2)Holy family Coptic Catholic church in Toronto – Ontario

There are five other eparchies and an exarchate in Canada:
 also Byzantine rite:
 Melkite Eparchy of Saint-Sauveur de Montréal, immediately subject to the Melkite Patriarch of Antioch
 Romanian Catholic Eparchy of St George's in Canton, a Romanian Greek Catholic Church Eparchy covering all of North America (including Canada), with cathedral see in Canton, Ohio
 Slovak Exarchate of Saints Cyril and Methodius of Toronto, Slovak Greek Catholic Church jurisdiction under the Ruthenian Greek Catholic Church's North American province, the Byzantine Catholic Metropolitan Church of Pittsburgh
 Antiochian Rite: Maronite Eparchy of Saint-Maron de Montréal, immediately subject to the Maronite Patriarch of Antioch
 Chaldean Rite: Chaldean Catholic Eparchy of Mar Addai of Toronto, directly dependent on the Chaldean Patriarch of Baghdad
 Syrian Catholic Apostolic Exarchate for Canada (immediately exempt to the Holy See)
 Syro-Malabar Catholic Eparchy of Mississauga (immediately exempt to the Holy See)
A few Eastern particular church communities are pastorally served from the United States:
 Armenian Rite: Armenian Catholic Eparchy of Our Lady of Nareg in New York, directly subject to the Patriarch of Cilicia

Canadian Catholic personalities

Patron Saint of Canada
Saint Joseph is Patron Saint of Canada.

Notable Canadian Catholics 
Neil McNeil (1851–1934)
Bernard Lonergan (1904–1984)
Marshall McLuhan (1911–1980)
Eric McLuhan (1942–2018)
Paul Desmarais (1927–2013)
Charles Taylor (philosopher) (1931–present)
Wayne Hankey (1944–present)
Marc Garneau (1949–present)
John Candy (1950–1994)
Catherine O'Hara (1954–present)
Wayne Gretzky (1961–present)
Celine Dion (1968–present)
Neve Campbell (1973–present)
Caroline Mulroney (1974–present)
Ben Mulroney (1976–present)

Prime Ministers 
Sir John Thompson (1845–1894)
Wilfrid Laurier (1841–1919)
Louis St. Laurent (1882–1973)
Pierre Trudeau (1919–2000)
Joe Clark (1939–present)
John Turner (1929–2020)
Brian Mulroney (1939–present)
Jean Chrétien (1934–present)
Paul Martin (1938–present)
Justin Trudeau (1971–present)

Lapsed Canadian Catholics 
Jim Carrey (1962–present) (Practices Transcendental Meditation).

Saints
 François de Laval
 Frère André
 Kateri Tekakwitha
 Marguerite Bourgeoys
 Marguerite D'Youville
 Marie de l'Incarnation
 Canadian Martyrs
 Isaac Jogues
 Antoine Daniel
 Jean de Brébeuf
 Gabriel Lalemant
 Charles Garnier
 Noël Chabanel
 René Goupil
 Jean de Lalande

Blessed

 Catherine de Saint-Augustin
 Dina Bélanger
 Émilie Tavernier Gamelin
 Frédéric Janssoone
 Louis-Zéphirin Moreau
 Marie-Élisabeth Turgeon
 Marie-Léonie Paradis
 Marie-Rose Durocher
 Nykyta Budka
 Vasyl Velychkovsky

Venerables
 Alfred Pampalon
 Anthony Kowalczyk
 Élisabeth Bergeron
 Délia Tétreault
 Vital-Justin Grandin

See also 
 Canadian Conference of Catholic Bishops
 Catholic Church sexual abuse cases in Canada
 Catholic sisters and nuns in Canada
 Catholic Press Association of the United States and Canada
 List of Catholic dioceses in Canada
 List of Catholic dioceses (structured view)
 List of Canadian Catholic saints
 List of Indian residential schools in Canada
 Indian Mass
 Protestantism in Canada
 Roman Catholic Archdiocese of St. John's, Newfoundland
 Sexual abuse cases in the Congregation of Christian Brothers

Further reading 
 Bramadat, Paul, and David Seljak, eds. Christianity and Ethnicity in Canada (2008)
 Clarke, Brian P. Piety and Nationalism: Lay Voluntary Associations and the Creation of an Irish catholic Community in Toronto, 1850–1895 (McGill-Queen's University Press, 1993)
 Fay, Terence J.  A History of Canadian Catholics: Gallicanism, Romanism, and Canadianism (2002)  excerpt and text search
 Gardaz, Michel. "Religious studies in Francophone Canada." Religion 41#1 (https://globalnews.ca/news/544459/statscan-roman-catholics-remains-single-largest-christian-religious-group-in-canada/1): 53–70.
 Huel, Raymond. Archbishop A-A Tache of St. Boniface: The "Good Fight" and the Illusive Vision (University of Alberta Press, 2003).
 Jaenen, Cornelius J. The Role of the Church in New France (McGraw-Hill Ryerson, 1976)
 Johnston, Angus Anthony. A History of the Catholic Church in Eastern Nova Scotia; Volume I: 1611- 1827 (1960)
 Johnston, A.B.J. Life and Religion at Louisbourg, 1713–1758 (MGill-Queen's University Press, 1996)
 Lahey, Raymond J. The First Thousand Years: A Brief History of the Catholic Church in Canada (2002)
 Laverdure, Paul. "Achille Delaere and the Origins of the Ukrainian Catholic Church in Western Canada." Historical Papers' (2004). online
 McGowan, Mark. Michael Power: The Struggle to Build the Catholic Church on the Canadian Frontier (McGill-Queen's Press-MQUP, 2005)
 McGowan, Mark G. ""Pregnant with Perils": Canadian Catholicism and Its Relation to the Catholic Churches of Newfoundland, 1840–1949." Newfoundland and Labrador Studies 28.2 (2013). online
 McGowan, Mark G. "Rendering Unto Caesar: Catholics, the State, and the Idea of a Christian Canada." Historical Papers (2011). online
 McGowan, Mark George and Brian P. Clarke, eds. Catholics at the Gathering Place: Historical Essays on the Archdiocese of Toronto, 1841–1991 (Dundurn, 1993)
 McGowan, Mark George. "Rethinking Catholic-Protestant Relations in Canada: The Episcopal Reports of 1900–1901." Canadian Catholic Historical Assoc., (1992) online
 McGowan, Mark G. "A Short History of Catholic Schools in Ontario." online
 McGowan, Mark G. "Rendering Unto Caesar: Catholics, the State, and the Idea of a Christian Canada." Historical Papers (2011).  online
 McGowan, Mark G. "The Maritimes Region and the Building of a Canadian Church: The Case of the Diocese of Antigonish after confederation." Canadian Catholic Historical Association (2004): 46–67. online
 Morice, A G. History of the Catholic Church in Western Canada: From Lake Superior to the Pacific (1659–1895) (2 vol; reprint Nabu Press, 2010)
 Murphy, Terrence, and Gerald Stortz, eds, Creed and Culture: The Place of English-Speaking Catholics in Canadian Society, 1750 – 1930 (1993), articles by scholars
 Pearson, Timothy G. Becoming Holy in Early Canada (McGill-Queen's Press-MQUP, 2014.)
 Perin, Roberto. Rome in Canada: the Vatican and Canadian affairs in the late Victorian age (U of Toronto Press, 1990)
 Trofimenkoff, Susan Mann. The Dream of Nation: A Social and Intellectual History of Quebec'' (1982). passim, esp pp 115–31

References

External links 
 Canadian Conference of Catholic Bishops
Observatory of religious freedom – Presentation of the religious situation in Canada
Catholicsm, The Canadian Encyclopedia
Assembly of Catholic Bishops of Ontario
Assembly of Catholic Bishops of Quebec
Military Ordinariate of Canada
 GigaCatholic
Apostolic Nunciature in Canada

 
Canada